Thelosia camina is a moth in the Apatelodidae family. It was described by William Schaus in 1896. It is found in Brazil (Parana).

The wingspan is about 38 mm. The forewings are fawn, finely speckled with brown. The hindwings are brownish at the base, but fawn on the outer portion.

References

Natural History Museum Lepidoptera generic names catalog

Apatelodidae
Moths described in 1896
Moths of South America